Diaguita michaelseni is a species of South American earthworm.

References

Haplotaxida
Animals described in 1942